Ar-Rum is the 30th chapter (sūrah) of the Quran, consisting of 60 verses (āyāt). The term Rūm originated in the word Roman, and during the time of the Islamic prophet Muhammad, it referred to the Eastern Roman Empire; the title is also sometimes translated as "The Greeks" or "The Byzantines".

The surah provides information on how the cataclysmic Byzantine–Sassanid War of 602–628 looked to the Arabs of Mecca—interested onlookers who were still unaware that, within a single generation, they would enter the realm of imperialism and defeat both the Byzantines and the Sassanids.

Summary
The chapter begins by noting the recent defeat of the Byzantine Empire to the Sassanid Empire in Jerusalem, near the Dead Sea. This defeat posed a significant theological and sociological problem for the early Muslim community because the Byzantines were Christians (considered to be "People of the Book" from the Islamic viewpoint) while the Sassanids who defeated them were Zoroastrians. Ar-Rum is in part a response to the non-Muslim Arab Meccans, who took the Sassanid victory as a sign that the traditional polytheistic practices would win out over the monotheism of the Abrahamic religions. In the third and fourth verses, the Muslim community is promised that the Byzantines will reverse their defeat into a victory and retake Jerusalem "in a few years' time".

Muslims believe this prophecy was fulfilled with Heraclius' campaign of 622, a Byzantine military counter-offensive that resulted in a crushing defeat for the Sassanids in Anatolia, and cite it as an example of the miraculous nature of the Quran.

Ayat (verses)
1-5 Prophecy concerning the ultimate triumph of the Greeks over the Persians
6-7 God's power manifest in nature
8-9 The Quraysh heed not the warnings of God
10-12 The despair of the infidels in the resurrection
13-15 The righteous and the wicked shall be separated on the Day of Judgement
16-17 God to be worshipped at stated periods
18 The changes in nature a proof of the resurrection
19-26 Various signs of God's omnipotence
27-28 The idolaters convinced of folly by reference to their own customs
29-31 Muhammad exhorted to follow the orthodox faith and to avoid idolatry
32-35 The ingratitude of idolaters, who call on God in adversity but forget him in prosperity
36-38 Muslims exhorted to charity
39 The idols unable to create and preserve life
40-41 God's judgements follow man's iniquity
42 Exhortation to repentance before the judgment
42-44 The separation of the wicked and the just on Judgement Day; rewards and punishments
45 God's goodness in his providence a sign to men
46 Those who rejected the former prophets were punished
47-49 God's mercy manifest in his works
50 A blasting wind sufficient to harden the hearts of the unbelievers
51-52 Muhammad unable to make the dead to hear or the blind to see
53 God the Creator
54-57 Believers and unbelievers on the resurrection day
58 The parables of the Quran rejected
59 Unbelievers are given over to blindness
60 Muhammad encouraged to steadfastness in the true religion

Chronology
Regarding the timing and contextual background of the revelation (asbāb al-nuzūl), it is an earlier "Meccan surah", which means it is believed to have been revealed in Mecca, instead of later in Medina. Parts of Q30:38-50 are preserved in the Ṣan‘ā’1 lower text.

According to Theodor Nöldeke, the surah of ar-Rum was the second-to-last Meccan surah and the 84th surah chronologically; however, he argues its 17th ayah was revealed during the Medinan period. While the first ayah of the surah refers to the defeat of the Byzantine Empire at the hands of the Sassanid Empire near Damascus in the spring of 614, Nöldeke notes that this does not necessarily indicate 614 was the year in which the surah was revealed.

According to al-Tabari, it refers to the Battle of Adhri'at in 614, but this battle is ignored in other sources.

Literary units

In his tafsir, entitled "In the Shade of the Qur'an", Sayyid Qutb divides the surah into two halves, verses 1–32 and verses 33–60. Each section begins with an assertion of God's grace and mercy and ends with encouragement for Muhammad and his community.

First Section "Signs to Reflect Upon"
  "The Natural Bond of Faith" Notes the Byzantine defeat and prophesies a coming victory promised by God
  "To Whom Power Belongs" Declares the truth of the universe
  "Invitation to Reflect" Reminds the believers of the fates of other disobedient communities
  "Two Divergent Wars" Describes the Last Judgment
  "Scene of God's Glory", "The Cycle of Life and Death", and "Man and the Universe" Offers praise for God and all His powers and signs
  "Analogy Drawn from Human Life" Uses a metaphor about slavery to condemn the sin of shirk
  "Concluding Directive to Prophet" Urges the listeners to turn to the truth and resist dividing into sects

Second Section "Bringing Life out of the Dead"
  "Vacillating Conditions" Reassures the Muslim community of God's mercy and grace for true believers and offers suggestions for behavior like giving to the needy or avoiding usury
  "Corruption and Pollution" Reminds people of the promise of resurrection at the Last Judgment and the fates of polytheist communities
  "Aspects of God's Grace" Emphasizes resurrection as one of signs of God's mercy and grace when believers lose hope
  "The Different Stages of Man's Life" Describes the weakness and folly of man and the fate of evildoers at the Last Judgment
  "No Change of Position" Decries the nonbelievers who refuse to listen to Muhammad but asserts that God leads astray who he wills
  Urges Muhammad and his community to persevere

Major themes
The main theme of this surah is the contrast between monotheism and polytheism. In addition to making logical arguments against ascribing partners to God, several verses outline the differing fate for idolaters and believers. The unity of God is also emphasized with descriptions of the glory of God through illustrations of His wondrous signs and His miraculous creation. This means that the main lessons of this surah is not to make partners to Allah, and to always have the fate of a believer.

Sample verse
Surah 30 includes a verse comparing the association of partners with God, which is the sin of shirk, to the relationship between a master and his slaves.

References

External links 
Q30:2, 50+ translations, islamawakened.com

Quran 30 Clear Quran translation

Rum
Byzantine–Sasanian War of 602–628